Sanctuary Housing is a large housing association based in Worcester, England. It is part of the Sanctuary Group,  which also includes other businesses such as Sanctuary Care (running more than 100 care homes), Sanctuary Students (accommodation), Sanctuary Supported Living, Sanctuary Scotland (social housing) and Sanctuary Homes (development). It manages 250,000 properties in the United Kingdom. Sanctuary is a trading name of Sanctuary Housing Association, an exempt charity in England and Wales.

Sanctuary Homes received a £3.4 million grant from the Scottish Government to finance housing developments in Paisley, Renfrewshire.

Sanctuary runs a supported living operation for more than 500 people with learning disabilities.

A proposed merger with Southern Housing Group was abandoned in April 2021.

Controversies

Racism 
In 2020, Sanctuary was accused of treating a black woman, Selma Nicholls (the CEO of a talent agency) unfairly compared with her white neighbour. Nicholls was refused a temporary rent freeze which she requested due to financial difficulties, while her white neighbour (requesting this under the same circumstances, for an identical property) was allowed one. Compared to her neighbour, Nicholls suffered a compounded loss of approximately £30,000 as a result.

Management and housing standards 
It was the subject of a Channel 4 Dispatches documentary in March 2019 in which tenants complained about various issues including damp, woodworm and flooding. The Regulator of Social Housing is said to have found no breaches of their standards.

It was attacked in the House of Commons in July 2019 by Mark Francois MP for Rayleigh and Wickford, who said it was ‘highly dysfunctional’ and had “consistently provided a poor maintenance service to many of my constituents over a period of many years”.  Shortly after this Rochford District Council, which is Conservative controlled, issued a joint statement with the association in which it said it had worked “successfully” with the association for 12 years.

References

External links 

 

Housing associations based in England
Public housing in the United Kingdom
Organisations based in Worcestershire